Francesco II (or IV) Gonzaga (10 August 1466 – ) was the ruler of the Italian city of Mantua from 1484 until his death.

Biography
Francesco was born in Mantua, the son of Marquess Federico I Gonzaga.

Francesco had a career as a condottiero acting as Venice's commander from 1489 to 1498. He was the commander-in-chief of the army of the Italian league in the battle of Fornovo, under the tutorage of his more experienced uncle Ridolfo Gonzaga: even though Francesco was unable to stop Charles VIII and his army from returning to France, he claimed Fornovo as a victory. Francesco was described as "short, pop-eyed, snub-nosed and exceptionally brave, and was regarded as the finest knight in Italy".

Francesco briefly commanded the Venetian army, but in 1502 he left to pay his respects to Louis XII who was then at Milan. By 29 April, he was with Louis XII when Genoa fell to the French army. Francesco, taking the initiative after the French victory at Agnadello, was occupying lands that he had lost to Venice. He was marching to Legnago with a company of French lances, when he was captured by the Venetians. Francesco only gained his freedom by giving his son Federico II as hostage. Once free, he was placed in command of papal troops, although he was ineffective since he stayed in Mantua. By 17 February 1510, Francesco, no longer involved in the war, allowed a French army under Gaston of Foix to march through his territory to reach Brescia.

During Francesco's absences, Mantua was governed by his wife Isabella d'Este, whom he had married on 12 February 1490. Under their reign, Mantua knew a great age of cultural splendour, with the presence in the city of artists such as Andrea Mantegna and Jacopo Bonacolsi. Francesco had the Palace of St. Sebastian built, where Mantegna's Triumph of Caesar was eventually placed. The Palace was where Francesco lived when in Mantua. His wife, Isabella d'Este remained at the Castello di San Giorgio where she had her own suite of rooms. On completing the decoration of his rooms at the palace, Francesco asked his wife for her views. Isabella commented favourably, though she did say that the decorations were almost as good as those within her studiolo.

Beginning in 1503, he started a long relationship with Lucrezia Borgia.

On 29 March 1519, Francesco, who had suffered from syphilis, died. He was succeeded by his son Federico, with Isabella acting as regent. Another son, Ferrante Gonzaga originated the branch of the Counts of Guastalla.

Loves 
Francesco was known for his passion for women, so much so that, on the occasion of the siege of Novara in 1495, his sister-in-law Beatrice d'Este, wanting to ingratiate herself with him, offered to personally procure him a "femmina di partito" with whom to celebrate the victory, under the pretext of protecting both him and his wife and sister Isabella from malfrancese.

Francis also actively practiced sodomy, according to the ancient Greek custom, very widespread almost everywhere at that time, as he himself proudly claims in his poisonous letter of accusations to Galeazzo Sanseverino, dated 1503: "I am reputed and raised by nobility of birth and good morals; you for human and ass favors (and I usually have a party at the door of others, and not at mine!)".

It is well known that he surrounded himself with ruffians and mezzani, who had the task of procuring for him girls and young ephebes. One of these was, among others, who therefore ran into the hatred of the Marquise.

Family
Isabella d'Este and Francesco Gonzaga had:
 Eleonora Gonzaga, born 1493, died 1570. Married Francesco Maria I della Rovere Duke of Urbino
 Margherita, born 1496.
 Livia, born 1501, died 1508.
 Ippolita Gonzaga, born 1503, died 1570. Ippolita became a nun in the Dominican convent of S. Vincenzo.
 Federico II, Duke of Mantua, born 1500, died 1540. First betrothed to Maria Palaeologina but later married her sister Margaret Palaeologina
 Ercole Gonzaga, born 1506, died 1565. Became a Cardinal.
 Ferrante Gonzaga, born 1507, died 1557. Married Isabella di Capua.
 Livia, later known as Sister Paola, born 1508, died 1569

Ancestry

See also
Rulers of Mantua
Condottieri
Italian Wars

Notes

Sources

External links
 Two busts of Francesco II Gonzaga

Francesco 2
Francesco 2
Military leaders of the Italian Wars
15th-century condottieri
Italian patrons of the arts
Military personnel from Mantua
1466 births
1519 deaths
16th-century Italian nobility
Burials in the Church of Santa Paola, Mantua